Balls of Steel is a British television comedy game show hosted by Mark Dolan. Dolan's special guests perform stunts and hold their nerve during hidden camera set-ups in the presence of celebrities or the British public.

Massive Balls of Steel, the spin-off series to Balls of Steel was broadcast on E4, showing highlights of the show.

Format
There were a total of 12 acts. In each episode, six acts competed with one of them being the winner from the previous episode. At the end of each episode the studio audience had to decide which act had the biggest 'Balls of Steel' by voting on a keypad. The Balls of Steel format is distributed internationally by DRG.

Acts
There were various acts seen frequently on the show, presented by the regular performers.

Transmissions

Balls of Steel internationally

UK version broadcasts
It aired on The Comedy Channel in Australia in 2011 and 2013 and in the past, has also been shown on the Nine Network. In Latin America, it is broadcast on Sony Entertainment Television, in New Zealand on C4, in Germany on RTL II, in Denmark on TV 2 Zulu, in Portugal on SIC Radical, Norway on TV2 Zebra, in Sweden on Kanal 5, in Poland on TVN, in the Netherlands on RTL 5, and in Russia on 2x2.

Local versions
In January 2007, a pilot for an American version hosted by J. Keith van Straaten was taped for the A&E network, but was not picked up for production.

During early 2007, an Italian adaptation of the format was aired on Rai Due, this version lasted just one season and wasn't picked up for a second season due to very poor ratings. The show featured local versions of the original skits such as Sexy Lisa, which was an adaptation from Bunny Boiler.

A Finnish version of the show is in production with Jukka and Jarppi of The Dudesons playing the part of 'The Pain Men'.

An Australian version of the show, Balls of Steel Australia was put into production in Sydney in late 2010 and premiered on the Australian subscription television channel The Comedy Channel on 19 April 2011, hosted by The Chaser's Craig Reucassel and running for an initial ten episodes. It was the highest rating show in the history of The Comedy Channel, doubling the ratings of the previous record holder The Merrick and Rosso Show. Ten episodes in total have been produced. The series stars Neg Dupree, reprising his Urban Sports segment from the UK version, as well as Australian versions of The Annoying Devil and Bunny Boiler. New characters include Nude Girl, James Kerley as the Game Show Host from Hell, Janis McGavin as Fame Whore, Very Foreign Correspondent, Flatmate Wanted and Just Come Out. Due to the success of season one, a second season was produced with new and existing acts, and premiered on 31 January 2012.

A Swedish version of the show has been shown on Swedish Channel 5 in the springs of 2009, 2010 and 2011. It was first produced for the Swedish public service broadcaster SVT, but cancelled since a participant sprayed water in the face of prime minister Fredrik Reinfeldt.

Controversy
Even before it was broadcast, Balls of Steel received an enormous amount of publicity during the London premiere of the film War of the Worlds; its leading actor Tom Cruise was squirted with a water pistol disguised as a microphone as a part of Olivia Lee's Prank TV segment. Cruise expressed his disdain, calling the prankster a "jerk" and later saying in a press conference: "There are bullies, people who like to make people feel less and feel bad. Those people need to be confronted. In my life I have never felt something like that is funny." However, it was not Olivia Lee who squirted Tom Cruise with water – the prank was performed by producer Michael Livingstone. Livingstone and three others from the crew were arrested after pranking Cruise but were later released on bail. However he did not press charges with his publicist saying "these guys aren’t worth the time or energy".

Cruise's reaction was not as extreme as that of Sharon Osbourne in an identical stunt several weeks before; she reacted by throwing a bucket of water over their camera. Osbourne was said to have offered Cruise's lawyers the paperwork covering her parallel incident. Osbourne also called for all celebrities to boycott Channel 4, however her boycott did not last as she herself has appeared on the channel many times since – including being guest host of The Friday Night Project in 2007.

Others who were attacked included Fredrik Reinfeldt, Prime Minister of Sweden. Sveriges Television, where the Swedish version Ballar av stål was going to air, decided to cancel the show after massive criticism.
But the show was picked up in 2008 by the Swedish network Kanal 5. 

The show has also had its fair share of complaints from viewers. Some complaints were directed at the Annoying Devil for his roller coaster stunt where he threw buckets of "vomit" at the passengers. Balls of Steel responded to OFCOM saying that the vomit used by the Annoying Devil was fake and a disclaimer was added when the episode was repeated. A further complaint to OFCOM was not upheld when the show explained that the "victims" in Neg Dupree's Big Stranger Rodeo Urban Sports segment had been "set up". Barrie Hall, who played the Annoying Devil in series two and three, said in an interview that "just about everyone we 'get' has been set up by friends."

The programme returned for a further series in 2007, for which its makers appealed for contestants for a pilot quiz show on an established quiz site. At least one participant rumbled the deceit almost immediately during filming on 10 June 2006, but despite his queries the makers refused to admit that the quiz was a hoax until the "broadcast" was over.

References

External links
 
 
 

2005 British television series debuts
2008 British television series endings
2000s British LGBT-related comedy television series
2000s British reality television series
2000s British game shows
Channel 4 comedy
Channel 4 game shows
English-language television shows
Hidden camera television series
2000s LGBT-related reality television series
Television series by All3Media
Stunt television series